Mount Johnson is a 12,871-foot-elevation (3,923 meter) mountain summit located on the crest of the Sierra Nevada mountain range in California, United States. It is situated on the boundary between Kings Canyon National Park and John Muir Wilderness, and along the county line between Fresno County and Inyo County. 
Mount Johnson ranks as the 187th-highest summit in California.

History
This mountain's name and location was proposed by the Sierra Club to honor Willard Drake Johnson (1859–1917), a geologist and topographer with the U. S. Geological Survey. The mountain's name was officially adopted in 1926 by the U.S. Board on Geographic Names. It is in the vicinity of other mountains named for distinguished members of the early U. S. Geological Survey, i.e. Mount Powell, Mount Gilbert, Mount Thompson, and Mount Goode.

Sierra Club member Jack Sturgeon climbed the peak August 14, 1939, by way of the western arête, and reported that the peak had previously been climbed twice by Norman Clyde, who is credited with 130 first ascents, most of which were in the Sierra Nevada. Clyde made the first ascent of nearby Mt. Gilbert in 1928, possibly climbing Johnson around the same time.

Climbing
Established climbing routes:
 Southeast slope – class 2
 West ridge – 1939 by Jack Sturgeon
 North ridge –  – July 16, 1960, by Barbara Lilley, Rich Gnagy, Sy Ossofsky

Climate
Mount Johnson is located in an alpine climate zone. Most weather fronts originate in the Pacific Ocean, and travel east toward the Sierra Nevada mountains. As fronts approach, they are forced upward by the peaks, causing them to drop their moisture in the form of rain or snowfall onto the range (orographic lift). Precipitation runoff from this mountain drains south into the Middle Fork Kings River, and north into Bishop Creek.

See also
 
 List of mountain peaks of California

References

External links
 Weather forecast: Mount Johnson
 Mt. Johnson rock climbing: Mountainproject.com
 Johnson, Willard Drake: Encyclopedia.com

Inyo National Forest
Mountains of Inyo County, California
Mountains of Fresno County, California
Mountains of Kings Canyon National Park
Mountains of the John Muir Wilderness
North American 3000 m summits
Mountains of Northern California
Sierra Nevada (United States)